Black Australians most often refers to:
Indigenous Australians, a term which includes
Aboriginal Australians 
Torres Strait Islanders

Black Australians  may also refer to: 

 African Australians
People from specific African countries
 African-American Australians
 Fijian Australians
 Papua New Guinean Australians
 South Sea Islanders

Ethnic groups in Australia